Sucha Psina, pronounced:  is a village in Opole Voivodeship, Głubczyce County, Gmina Baborów.

Villages in Głubczyce County